Too Tired to Hate is a 1995 Estonian action film directed by Hannes Lintrop and Renita Lintrop.

Awards 
 1996: Baltic Pearl Film Festival (Riga, Latvia), best debut: Jarl Karjatse
 1996: Alexandria International Film Festival (Egypt), special prize by the jury
 1996: Carrousel international du film de Rimouski (Canada), Camério award to the best actor: Jarl Karjatse

Cast
 Jarl Karjatse - Siim
 Martin Algus - Jüri
 Helen Kadastik -  Merike
 Marek Pavlov - Juku

References

External links
 
 Ma olen väsinud vihkamast, entry in Estonian Film Database (EFIS)

1995 films
Estonian action films
Estonian-language films